Free Trade Unions may refer to:

Free Trade Unions of the Coast, a Polish labor union
Free Trade Unions (Germany), a German labor organization
Free Trade Union, a British organization
Free Trade Unions (Bulgaria), a Bulgarian labor organization
Free Trade Unions (Poland), a German trade unions in Poland, based in the former Prussian territories that were ceded to Poland